Salomon Wolf Willy Schapiro (also Szapiro or Schapira)  (25 May 1910 in Skala, Poland – 21 February 1944, executed at the fort Mont Valérien), was a Polish Jew, and a soldier in the FTP-MOI French liberation army in the Manouchian group).

Youth
Schapiro left Poland around 1930 and emigrated to Palestine. He developed a workers' organisation whose aim was to hunt the British power which controlled the region after the dismantling of the Ottoman empire in 1918. His activities brought about his arrest, then expulsion. He subsequently emigrated to Austria from 1933 to 1939.

Second world war
In 1938, at the time of the Anschluss, Schapiro fled to Paris via Switzerland where he worked as a furrier, living in the 9th arrondissement.  He joined the FTP-MOI in May 1943. He was arrested on 27 October 1943 in an attack on a German military convoy. He was tortured but did not reveal any information about his network.

Schapiro was condemned to death by the occupier, and he was executed by shooting at the fort Mont Valérien on 21 February 1944 with 23 members of the Manouchian group.

See also
 Francs-tireurs et partisans - Main-d'œuvre immigrée
 Francs-tireurs et partisans
 Main-d'œuvre immigrée
 Affiche rouge

External links
   La journée d'un "Terroriste"
 Discours d'André SANTINI et Henry KARAYAN

1910 births
1944 deaths
People executed by Germany by firearm
People from Kraków County
Polish Jews who died in the Holocaust
Jews in the French resistance
Jewish emigrants from Austria after the Anschluss
Polish people executed by Nazi Germany
Executed people from Lesser Poland Voivodeship
Resistance members killed by Nazi Germany